Domenico Rossi (born 9 May 2000) is an Italian professional footballer who plays as a midfielder for  club Pro Patria, on loan from Venezia.

Career
He joined the youth teams of Venezia in the summer of 2017 and was first called up to the senior squad in 2018.

He made his Serie B debut for Venezia on 17 October 2020 in a game against Cremonese. He substituted Antonio Junior Vacca in the 76th minute of a 0–0 draw.

On 18 July 2021, he joined Vis Pesaro on loan.

On 20 July 2022, Rossi was loaned to Pro Patria.

References

External links
 

2000 births
Living people
People from Busto Arsizio
Footballers from Lombardy
Italian footballers
Association football midfielders
Serie B players
Serie C players
Venezia F.C. players
Vis Pesaro dal 1898 players
Aurora Pro Patria 1919 players
Sportspeople from the Province of Varese